Sirithu Vazha Vendum is a 1974 Indian Tamil-language film written and directed by S. S. Balan. The film stars M. G. Ramachandran, Latha and M. N. Nambiar. It is a remake of the 1973 Hindi film Zanjeer. The film was released on 30 November 1974, and ran for over 100 days in theatres.

Plot 
During his childhood, Ramu escapes from killing during the massacre of his parents. He grows up, haunted by the memory of this horrible night, drawing indefatigably a white horse, resulting from the chain bracelet of the mysterious killer. He also turns into a fearless and death-defying cop with an unsatiable urge to get vengeance.  

Later, he finds the murderer some years later on his policeman's way with the help of Usthad Abdul Rahman, an ex-owner of a cabaret who once was Ramu's enemy but now has sworn to give his life for Ramu after a initial fight, and settles the score with him.

Cast 
M. G. Ramachandran as Inspector Ramu and Usthad Abdul Rahman
Latha as Mala
M. N. Nambiar as Nakanraj
R. S. Manohar as Othai Kannu
Thengai Srinivasan as "Kedhy" Pakiri
L. Kanchana (also Junior Kanchana) as Nakanraj's mistress
V. S. Raghavan as De Selva
V. Gopalakrishnan as The superior of Ramu
Isari Velan as a bad guy
V. R. Thilakam as Janaki, Ramu's mother
S. V. Ramdas as Dayalu
Peeli Sivam as Vigilance officer
T. K. S. Natarajan as Tailor
Idichapuli Selvaraj as Vasthath / Rogue
Karikol Raju as Gambler
Pandu as Cheater in gambling
Pasi Narayanan as Drama organizer
Trichy Soundararajan  as Marimuthu, Ramu's father
S. R. Veeraraghavan as a police officer, Ramu's foster father

Soundtrack 
The soundtrack was composed by M. S. Viswanathan.

Reception 
Kanthan of Kalki said the film, despite its title, had nothing to make audiences cheerful.

References

External links 
 

1970s Tamil-language films
1974 films
Films scored by M. S. Viswanathan
Films with screenplays by Salim–Javed
Tamil remakes of Hindi films